MTV3 Scifi was a Finnish television channel owned and operated by MTV3.

MTV3 announced in June 2012 scheduled closedown of MTV3 Scifi Channel, and in its place will be starting MTV3 Fakta XL on August 13, 2012.

References

External links
www.mtv3.fi/scifi

Defunct television channels in Finland
Television channels and stations established in 2008
Television channels and stations disestablished in 2012